Brzoza  (or 1937–1945 ) is a village in the administrative district of Gmina Borów, within Strzelin County, Lower Silesian Voivodeship, in south-western Poland. Prior to 1945 it was in Germany.

References

Brzoza